This is a list of Members of the Northern Ireland Assembly elected in 1973.

All members elected to the Northern Ireland Assembly at the 1973 election are listed and grouped by party.

Members by party
This is a list of members elected in the 1973 Northern Ireland Assembly election, sorted by party.

 John Laird, Hugh Smyth and Jean Coulter used the label "West Belfast Loyalist Coalition" simultaneously whilst standing under different party affiliations.

Members by constituency
The list is given in alphabetical order by constituency.

 John Laird, Hugh Smyth and Jean Coulter used the label "West Belfast Loyalist Coalition" simultaneously whilst standing under different party affiliations.

Changes

By-Elections

References
Northern Ireland Elections: Northern Ireland Assembly Elections 1973

Northern Ireland Assembly 1973
 
Northern Ireland Assembly (1973)